The Southern Ewaso Ng'iro (Brown River) is a river in the Great Rift Valley in Kenya.
It plays an important role in the ecology of Lake Natron, the main regular breeding site for near-threatened lesser flamingos.
Changes to land use in the river's headwaters or in the marshes before the river enters the lake could have a serious impact on this species.

Course
The Ewaso Ng'iro rises on the Mau Escarpment, where it drains the south part of the Mau Forest. The forest, which plays an important role in regulating and filtering the inflow to the river, is under threat from logging and land clearance for farming.  Destruction would increase sediment loads in the river and cause greater seasonal variance in the volume of water. The river flows south through the rift valley to the east of the Nguruman Escarpment.  It crosses the border into Tanzania, where it empties into Lake Natron.  The river, which runs all year round, is the main inflow to the lake.

The river once flowed directly into the lake, but in geologically recent times it has been dammed by a horst beside the Shompole volcano. This has caused the waters to spread out into the steadily expanding Engare Ng'iro swamp, where the river deposits its sediment. The sediment-free river water then seeps into the brine lake. South of this a seasonal floodplain of about  stretches down to Lake Natron and along its eastern shore.

Possible changes

The Lake Natron basin has been designated a Wetlands of International Importance under the Ramsar Convention.
However, in the past there have been plans to dam the Ewaso Ng'iro for hydroelectric power generation and for irrigation of the marshlands north of the lake, diverting water from other rivers to increase the flow.

If implemented, the impact on the lake's ecology could be drastic. Reduced salinity and pollution with agri-chemicals could wipe out the blue-green algae that provide food for the lesser flamingo.  The lake is the main breeding ground for this near-threatened species. As of 2007 the dam project appeared to be on hold.

References

Rivers of Kenya